Escuela de Futbol Guazapa is a Salvadoran professional football club based in Guazapa, El Salvador. It was founded in 2012.

The club currently plays in the Tercera Division de Fútbol Salvadoreño.

Honours
 Apertura 2016

Captain
 Joel Avilés (2016)

List of coaches
  Welman Salomón Reyes (2012)
  Ulises Monge (2014)

References

Football clubs in El Salvador